MS  Sounds of Orient was an ocean liner owned since 1988 by Crosby Corp. Ltd in Panama. She was built in 1962 by VEB Mathias-Thesen Werft, Wismar, East Germany as Khabarovsk for the Soviet Union's Far East Shipping Company. The ship was used for service between Nakhodka and Yokohama, Japan. It was named after the largest city and the administrative center of Khabarovsk Krai, Soviet Union Khabarovsk.

See also
 List of cruise ships

References

External links
Sounds of Orient (Хабаровск → 1988) 

Cruise ships
Ships built in East Germany
Passenger ships of the Soviet Union
East Germany–Soviet Union relations
1961 ships
Ships built in Wismar